Santia Deck (born November 19, 1991) is an American athlete. She started her career as a fitness trainer and gained a following on social media through her workouts and flag football skills. Deck is the highest paid female American football player in the Women's Football League Association after signing a deal with a new team the Los Angeles Fames in 2020.

She works for Osage Phoenix as their executive vice president of marketing, coaching other social media influencers on how to get paid by brands to promote their products.

Early life and education 
Deck was born on November 19, 1991 in Greenville, South Carolina and raised in Houston, Texas. She won a full track and field scholarship to Texas A&M University and graduated with a bachelor's degree in English and literature.

At the age of seven she signed up for a track program during the summer.

Career 
In rugby union she played with the Atlanta Harlequins, Stars Rugby 7s and the Bay of Plenty Rugby Union in New Zealand. She was asked to try out for the USA women's team in Rugby sevens at the Summer Olympics of 2020 but an injury occurred.

She joined the Legends Football League (LFL) in 2017.

In December 2019 Deck became the first woman to enter into a professional full tackle football contract with a forthcoming all female league - the Women's Football League Association (WFLA).

Deck is known online as the 'queen of abs' and hosts her own TV talk show Queen of Abs Fitness. She also appeared in Steve Austin's Broken Skull Ranch, and Blind Date.

In July 2020, Deck founded a startup company called Tronus which sells sneakers.

References 

Female players of American football
Texas A&M University–Kingsville alumni
Sportspeople from Greenville, South Carolina
1991 births
Living people
American female rugby union players
21st-century American women